Standardized Berber may refer to:

 Standard Moroccan Amazigh
 Standard Algerian Berber